Azarsi-ye Hoseyn Khanzadeh (also Romanized as Āzārsī-ye Ḩoseyn Khānzādeh) is a village in Deraz Kola Rural District, Babol Kenar District, Babol County, Mazandaran Province, Iran. At the 2006 census, its population was 20, in 4 families.

References 

Populated places in Babol County